Illinois (styled Sufjan Stevens Invites You to: Come on Feel the Illinoise on the cover; sometimes spelled as Illinoise) is a 2005 concept album by American singer-songwriter Sufjan Stevens. His fifth studio album, it features songs referencing places, events, and persons related to the U.S. state of Illinois. Illinois  is Stevens' second based on a U.S. state—part of a planned series of fifty that began with the 2003 album Michigan and that Stevens has since acknowledged was a joke.

Stevens recorded and produced the album at multiple venues in New York City using low-fidelity studio equipment and a variety of instruments between late 2004 and early 2005. The artwork and lyrics explore the history, culture, art, and geography of the state—Stevens developed them after analyzing criminal, literary, and historical documents. Following its release, Stevens promoted Illinois with a world tour.

Critics praised the album for its well-written lyrics and complex orchestrations. In particular, reviewers noted Stevens' progress as a songwriter since the release of Michigan. Illinois was named the best-reviewed album of 2005 by review aggregator Metacritic, and was included on several reviewers' "best of the decade" lists—including those of Paste, NPR, and Rolling Stone. According to aggregate website Acclaimed Music, Illinois is the most acclaimed album of 2005, 7th most acclaimed album of 2000s and 95th most acclaimed album in history. The album amounted to Stevens' greatest public success to date; it was his first to place on the Billboard 200, and it topped the Billboard list of "Heatseekers Albums". The varied instrumentation and experimental songwriting on the album invoked comparisons to work by Steve Reich, Neil Young, and the Cure. Besides numerous references to Illinois, Stevens continued a theme of his songwriting career by including multiple references to his Christian faith.

Background, recording, and tour

Stevens launched his 50-state project in 2003 with the album Michigan and chose to focus on Illinois with this recording because "it wasn't a great leap", and he liked the state because he considered it the "center of gravity" for the American Midwest. Before creating the album, Stevens read literature by Illinois authors Saul Bellow and Carl Sandburg, and studied immigration records and history books for the state—he made the deliberate decision to avoid current events and focused on historical themes. He also took trips through several locations in Illinois and asked friends and members of Internet chat rooms for anecdotes about their experiences in the state. Although he began work in 2004 on Oregon-themed songs and briefly considered releasing a Rhode Island 7", Stevens has since not released another album focused on a state, saying in a November 2009 interview with Paste that "the whole premise was such a joke," and telling Andrew Purcell of The Guardian in October 2009 "I have no qualms about admitting [the fifty states project] was a promotional gimmick." An Arkansas-related song was released through NPR as "The Lord God Bird" and material intended for New Jersey and New York became The BQE.

All of the songs on Illinois were written, recorded, engineered, and produced by Stevens, with most of the material being recorded at The Buddy Project studio in Astoria, Queens, and in Stevens' Brooklyn apartment. As with his previous albums, Stevens recorded in various locations, with additional piano recorded in St. Paul's Church in Brooklyn; strings and vocals performed in collaborators' apartments; electronic organ recorded in the New Jerusalem Recreational Room in Clarksboro, New Jersey; and vibraphone played at Carroll Music Studios in New York City. Stevens mostly created the album without collaboration, focusing on the writing, performance, and technical creation of the album by himself: "I was pretty nearsighted in the construction of Illinois. I spent a lot of time alone, a few months in isolation working on my own and in the studio. I let things germinate and cultivate independently, without thinking about an audience or a live show at all."

Stevens employed low-fidelity recording equipment, which allowed him to retain creative control and keep costs low on recording Illinois. Typically, his process involved recording to 32 kHz 8-track tape using inexpensive microphones such as the Shure SM57 and AKG C1000. He then employed Pro Tools for mixing and other production tasks.

After consulting with Michael Kaufmann and Lowell Brams of Asthmatic Kitty about the amount of material he had recorded, Stevens decided against a double album, saying that would be "arrogant". In 2006, several tracks recorded during these sessions were sent to Seattle-based musician and producer James McAllister for additional instrumentation and production, and were released in 2006 on the follow-up album The Avalanche: Outtakes and Extras from the Illinois Album. Among these outtakes are three separate recordings of the song "Chicago"—including the "Multiple Personality Disorder Version", which was produced during a subsequent tour. The "Adult Contemporary Easy Listening Version" of the song was supposed to appear on the Illinois album, but was changed at the last minute.

Illinois was released on July 4, 2005, through Rough Trade Records in Europe and was distributed domestically by Asthmatic Kitty Records starting July 5, 2005. Although he initially had no plans to perform this material live, less than two weeks after the release of Illinois, Stevens embarked on a North American tour to promote the album, performing with a string section of eight to ten members named the Illinoisemakers. He deliberately chose to avoid television as a promotional tool and focused on the tour performances themselves. He was supported on some dates by opening acts Liz Janes (who is also signed to Asthmatic Kitty) and Laura Veirs as well as Illinois collaborator Shara Nova's solo project My Brightest Diamond. He toured in support of the album again from September through November 2006, this time including dates in several European cities. During the 2006 dates, Stevens and his band transitioned from wearing University of Illinois-themed outfits to butterfly suits and bird wings.

Musical style and themes

Reviewers have noted similarities between this album and those of musicians and composers in several musical genres—from pop to contemporary classical, even show tunes and jazz-based time signatures. The lyrics and their rich thematic elements have been noted for their literary quality, earning comparisons to Ralph Waldo Emerson, Henry David Thoreau, William Carlos Williams, and Walt Whitman. Genre labels that have been applied to the album include indie folk, indie pop, indie rock, folk rock, chamber folk, and lo-fi.

Musical style
Reviewers of Illinois have compared Stevens' style to Steve Reich, Vince Guaraldi, the Danielson Famile, Neil Young, Nick Drake, and Death Cab for Cutie. Stevens' use of large orchestral arrangements in his music—much of it played by himself through the use of multi-track recording—has been noted by several reviewers. Rolling Stone summarized the musical influences of Illinois, saying "the music draws from high school marching bands, show tunes and ambient electronics; we can suspect Steve Reich's Music for 18 Musicians is an oft-played record in the Stevens household, since he loves to echo it in his long instrumental passages." A review in The A.V. Club referred to some of the vocal work as "regressively twee communalism", but found Stevens' music overall to be "highly developed". The song "Come On! Feel the Illinoise!" has a saxophone part resembling "Close to Me" by The Cure.

The creation of Illinois marked a shift in Stevens' emphasis on songwriting and studio work toward live performance and more abstract concepts of motion and sound—subsequent tours and albums emphasized electronic music and modern dance over the indie folk material on Michigan and Illinois. He has ceased writing songs about individual characters with straightforward narratives or concept albums and briefly considered quitting the music business entirely after creating and promoting this album. He also found that the way in which he listened to music had changed after producing Illinois:

Stevens is a classically trained oboist and his knowledge of classical and baroque music influenced many of his arrangements. Stevens himself has noted the influence of composers Igor Stravinsky, Sergei Rachmaninoff, and Edvard Grieg; along with contemporary composers Terry Riley, Steve Reich, and Philip Glass. The music on this album was written to be grandiose, to match the history of the territory. Stevens used time signature changes in the composition of Illinois for dynamic effect—for instance, "Come On! Feel the Illinoise!" begins with a 5/4 time signature and then changes to a standard 4/4 later in the song.

Illinois themes

Many of the lyrics in Illinois make references to persons, places, and events related to the state of the same name. "Concerning the UFO Sighting Near Highland, Illinois" is about a UFO sighting by police officers near Highland, Illinois, where several persons reported seeing a large triangular object with three lights flying at night. "Come on! Feel the Illinoise!" makes reference to the World's Columbian Exposition, which took place in Chicago in 1893.

"John Wayne Gacy, Jr." documents the story of the 1970s Chicago-based serial killer of the same name. Several lyrics make explicit references to events in his life: "[w]hen the swingset hit his head" refers to an event in Gacy's childhood, when a swing hit his head and caused a blood clot in his brain; "He dressed up like a clown for them / with his face paint white and red" alludes to the nickname given to Gacy—the "Killer Clown"; and "He put a cloth on their lips / Quiet hands, quiet kiss on the mouth" references Gacy's use of chloroform to subdue and molest his victims. The song ends with the narrator turning inward with the lyrics: "And in my best behavior, I am really just like him / Look beneath the floorboards for the secrets I have hid." Stevens stated in a 2009 interview with Paste that "we're all capable of what [Gacy] did."

"Casimir Pulaski Day" interweaves a personal story with the state holiday Casimir Pulaski Day. "The Man of Metropolis Steals Our Hearts" makes references to Superman, whose fictional hometown of Metropolis was partially modeled after Chicago (the town of Metropolis, Illinois has also capitalized on this association). Jessica Hopper of the Chicago Reader noted that Ray Middleton—who was the first actor to play the comic book superhero—was also born in Chicago. "They Are Night Zombies!! They Are Neighbors!! They Have Come Back from the Dead!! Ahhhh!" makes references to ghost towns of Illinois. Stevens relates experiences from a summer camp he went to as a child in Michigan for "The Predatory Wasp of the Palisades Is Out to Get Us!", but moved the locale to Illinois for the sake of the album. The track "Decatur, or, Round of Applause for Your Stepmother!" includes references to Decatur, Illinois, but Stevens stated the track also acted as "an exercise in rhyme schemes". Some references to Decatur included in the song were alligator sightings in the area, the equipment manufacturer Caterpillar, and a flood that exhumed a graveyard of soldiers from the Civil War.

Other allusions to the state's people, places, and events include the Black Hawk War, author Carl Sandburg, Stephen A. Douglas, Abraham Lincoln, the Sangamon River, the Chicago Cubs, Lydia Moss Bradley, the Sears Tower dubbed "Seer's Tower" (now called Willis Tower), and the localities of Jacksonville, Peoria, Metropolis, Savanna, Caledonia, Secor, Magnolia, Kankakee, Evansville, and the several locations named Centerville, Illinois. During the tour following the release of Illinois, Stevens' band wore cheerleader outfits based on those of the University of Illinois.

Christianity

Although Illinois is a concept album about the U.S. state, Stevens also explored themes related to Christianity and the Bible. As a Christian, he has written and recorded music about spiritual themes throughout his career—particularly on the 2004 album Seven Swans—and prefers to talk about religious topics through song rather than directly in interviews or public statements. The song "Decatur, or, Round of Applause for Your Stepmother!" includes the line "It's the great I Am"—taken from the response God gave when Moses asked for his name in the Book of Exodus. "Casimir Pulaski Day" describes the death of a romantic partner due to bone cancer (despite Bible study prayers for healing), and the narrator questions God in the process. More abstract allusions appear in "The Man of Metropolis Steals Our Hearts", which utilizes Superman as a Christ figure and "The Seer's Tower", which references the Book of Revelation and the Second Coming of Christ. Songs which were not written with an explicit theological focus—such as "John Wayne Gacy, Jr."—also feature religious themes such as sin and redemption.

Artwork

Divya Srinivasan created the album artwork, depicting a variety of Illinois-related themes, including Abraham and Mary Todd Lincoln, the Sears Tower, and Black Hawk. The album cover reads, "Sufjan Stevens Invites You To: Come On Feel the Illinoise!" as a wordplay on the common mispronunciation of the state's name as "ill-i-NOYZ" and a reference to the Slade song "Cum On Feel the Noize" made famous in the United States by the metal band Quiet Riot. The text on the cover caused some confusion over the actual title of the album—it is officially titled Illinois, as opposed to Come on Feel the Illinoise or Illinoise. Paste listed Illinois as having the seventh best album art of the decade 2000–2009. The album also won the PLUG Independent Music Award for Album Art/Packaging of the Year in 2006.

Shortly after the release of the album, reports arose that DC Comics had issued a cease and desist letter to Asthmatic Kitty because of the depiction of Superman on the cover. However, on October 4, 2005, Asthmatic Kitty announced that there had been no cease and desist letter; the record company's own lawyers had warned about the copyright infringement. On June 30, 2005, Asthmatic Kitty's distributor Secretly Canadian asked its retailers not to sell the album; however, it was not recalled. On July 5, the distributor told its retailers to go ahead and sell their copies, as DC Comics agreed to allow Asthmatic Kitty to sell the copies of the album that were already manufactured, but the image was removed from subsequent pressings. Soon after it was made public that the cover would be changed, copies of the album featuring Superman were sold for as high as $75 on eBay. On the vinyl edition released on November 22, 2005, Superman's image is covered by a balloon sticker. The image of the balloon sticker was also used on the cover of the compact disc and later printings of the double vinyl release. Stevens himself was surprised by the development and also had to pay a fee for referencing lyrics from Woody Guthrie's folk anthem "This Land Is Your Land" in the track "No Man's Land", which was later released on The Avalanche.

The 10th anniversary vinyl reissue of Illinois features the Marvel character Blue Marvel, who hails from Chicago, in place of Superman. Asthmatic Kitty obtained permission from Marvel to use the character's likeness. The Blue Marvel edition's artwork was created by Divya Srinivasan and has LP 1 on "cape white" vinyl, LP 2 on "antimatter blue" vinyl, and a bonus single of "Chicago (Demo)" (on both sides) on a red vinyl 12" disc shaped like a six-sided star in reference to the municipal flag of Chicago.

Critical reception

Illinois was Sufjan Stevens' greatest commercial and critical success to date. For the first time, his work charted on the Billboard 200 and received several awards from critics.  The site assesses this as "universal acclaim" and designated it the best-reviewed album of 2005, alongside Z by My Morning Jacket. In 2020, Consequence of Sound ranked several of Stevens' studio albums, with Illinois coming in second behind the 2015 release Carrie & Lowell.

Andy Battaglia of The A.V. Club said that Stevens "has grown into one of the best song-makers in indie rock" with the album. Tim Jonze of NME called Illinois "a brainy little fucker" and described Stevens as "prolific, intelligent and—most importantly—brimming with heart-wrenching melodies." Rob Sheffield of Rolling Stone responded favorably to the album, praising the "over-the-top arrangements" and Stevens' "breathy, gentle voice" as well as the personal nature of songs such as "Chicago" and "Casimir Pulaski Day", but criticized "John Wayne Gacy, Jr.", stating that it "symbolizes nothing about American life except the existence of creative-writing workshops". Michael Metivier of PopMatters described "John Wayne Gacy, Jr." as "horrifying, tragic, and deeply sad without proselytizing." Amanda Petrusich of Pitchfork described Illinois as "strange and lush, as excessive and challenging as its giant, gushing song titles." Dave Simpson of The Guardian echoed this sentiment by saying that the music sounds like "The Polyphonic Spree produced by Brian Eno." The diversity in instrumentation also received a positive review from Entertainment Weeklys Kristina Feliciano.

Jesse Jarnow of Paste praised the playful nature of Illinois, commenting that it had "sing-song" melodies and "jaunty" orchestrations. Jarnow also noted ironic lyrics, citing a line from "The Predatory Wasp of the Palisades is Out to Get Us!": "I can't explain the state I'm in ..." after a section of the song that references many Illinois landmarks. Q called the album a "sizeable step forward" from Michigan, and said Stevens' love for the state of Illinois is infectious. Critic Andy Gill dubbed Illinois "an extraordinary achievement" in Uncut, and in a separate review for The Independent added that it "makes most other albums seem small-minded and, ironically, rather parochial." Catherine Lewis of The Washington Post responded favorably to the album, stating that it has well-written lyrics, comparing Stevens' rhyming to that of Stephin Merritt. Lewis cited "Casimir Pulaski Day" as one of the most memorable songs of the album. In December 2005, American webzine Somewhere Cold voted Illinois CD of the Year on their 2005 Somewhere Cold Awards Hall of Fame list.

Accolades
Illinois achieved recognition with inclusion on numerous reviewers' "best of the year" and "best of the decade" lists. In particular, the album topped the best of the decade list appearing in the November 2009 issue of Paste  and NPR named Illinois on their list of "The Decade's 50 Most Important Recordings". Pitchfork called Illinois the sixteenth best album of the decade, with Stevens' previous album—Michigan—placing 70 on that same list. The album also won the 2005 New Pantheon Award—a type of Shortlist Music Prize. The album was also included in the book 1001 Albums You Must Hear Before You Die. Finally, Paste listed Stevens as one of their "100 Best Living Songwriters" in 2006, primarily due to the writing on Michigan and Illinois.

Commercial performance
In its first week of sales, Illinois sold 9,000 copies, 20% coming from online sales. Overall, the album sold more than 100,000 copies by November 2005 and over 300,000 by the end of 2009. It was Stevens' first release to place on the Billboard 200, reaching number 121 within eight weeks on the chart. It also reached number one on Billboards Heatseekers Albums chart and number four on the Independent Albums chart, remaining on them for 32 and 39 weeks, respectively. In August 2017, the album was certified gold by the Recording Industry Association of America (RIAA), signifying shipments in excess of 500,000 copies in the United States.

In July 2013, it was certified silver by the British Phonographic Industry (BPI) for 60,000 sold units in the United Kingdom.

Track listing

Note
The titles of the songs vary slightly from the Compact Disc, digital, and vinyl releases. Full titles come directly from the vinyl album and have been adapted to the English titlecase standards.

Personnel

Sufjan Stevens – acoustic guitar, piano, Wurlitzer, bass guitar, drums, electric guitar, oboe, alto saxophone, flute, banjo, glockenspiel, accordion, vibraphone, recorders (alto, sopranino, soprano, & tenor), Casiotone MT-70, sleigh bells, shakers, tambourine, triangle, electronic organ, vocals, arrangements, engineering, recording, production
Julianne Carney – violin
Alan Douches – mastering at West West Side Music, Tenafly, New Jersey
Jon Galloway – remixing on "Chicago" (To String Remix)
Marla Hansen – viola
The Illinoisemaker Choir – backing vocals and clapping on "The Black Hawk War, or, How to Demolish an Entire Civilization and Still Feel Good About Yourself in the Morning, or, We Apologize for the Inconvenience but You're Going to Have to Leave Now, or, 'I Have Fought the Big Knives and Will Continue to Fight Them Until They Are Off Our Lands!'", "Chicago", "The Man of Metropolis Steals Our Hearts", "They Are Night Zombies!! They Are Neighbors!! They Have Come Back from the Dead!! Ahhhh!", and "The Tallest Man, the Broadest Shoulders"
Tom Eaton
Jennifer Hoover
Katrina Kerns
Beccy Lock
Tara McDonnell

Maria Bella Jeffers – cello
Katrina Kerns – backing vocals on "Concerning the UFO Sighting Near Highland, Illinois", "Come On! Feel the Illinoise!", "Jacksonville", "Prairie Fire That Wanders About", "The Predatory Wasp of the Palisades Is Out to Get Us!", "The Seer's Tower", "The Tallest Man, the Broadest Shoulders", and "The Avalanche"
James McAlister – drums, drum engineering
Craig Montoro – trumpet, backing vocals on "They Are Night Zombies!! They Are Neighbors!! They Have Come Back from the Dead!! Ahhhh!"
Rob Moose – violin
Matt Morgan – backing vocals on "Decatur, or, Round of Applause for Your Stepmother!"
Daniel and Elin Smith – backing vocals and clapping on "Decatur, or, Round of Applause for Your Stepmother!"
Divya Srinivasan – artwork
Shara Worden – backing vocals on "Concerning the UFO Sighting Near Highland, Illinois", "Come On! Feel the Illinoise!", "John Wayne Gacy, Jr.", "Casimir Pulaski Day", "Prairie Fire That Wanders About", "The Predatory Wasp of the Palisades Is Out to Get Us!", "The Seer's Tower", "The Tallest Man, the Broadest Shoulders", and "The Avalanche"

Charts

Weekly charts

Year-end charts

Certifications

Musical adaptation
A stage musical adaptation of Illinois is in development, with a book written by Jackie Sibblies Drury and Justin Peck and directed and choreographed by Peck. It will premiere at Bard College on June 23, 2023, with a Chicago production planned for 2024. The show will feature new arrangements for a live band and three voices, and aims to "lead [the audience] on a mighty journey through the American heartland, from campfire storytelling to the edges of the cosmos".

See also

2005 in music
Culture of Chicago
"Cum On Feel the Noize" – a 1973 hard rock song by Slade that inspired the full title of the album
Donald Glover, who remixed the album as Illin'-Noise! under the name mc DJ
Greetings from Cairo, Illinois – a 2005 album from Stace England about Cairo, Illinois
Songs about the United States
State Songs – a 1999 album from John Linnell about American states, which leads off with a song about Illinois
Will it play in Peoria?

References

External links

Asthmatic Kitty's page for Illinois

"Sufjan Stevens and the Curious Case of the Missing 48 States" from The Ringer

2005 albums
Albums arranged by Sufjan Stevens
Albums produced by Sufjan Stevens
Anti-folk albums
Asthmatic Kitty albums
Baroque pop albums
Christian music albums by American artists
Concept albums
Folk rock albums by American artists
Illinois culture
Illinois in fiction
Lo-fi music albums
Rough Trade Records albums
Secretly Canadian albums
Sufjan Stevens albums
Superman in other media